The following games were initially announced as Nintendo Wii titles, but were subsequently cancelled or postponed indefinitely by developers or publishers.

References

 
Wii games
Wii